Gaurav Natekar (born 4 April 1972) is a seven-time Indian National Tennis Champion. He was awarded the Arjuna Award in 1996 for Tennis.

His father, Nandu M. Natekar, was a national-level Indian badminton champion.

Achievements
Represented the country in Davis Cup from 1992-97. Was member of the team that reached the semi-final in '93
Double gold medallist at the Hiroshima Asian Games in 1994 (team event and doubles with Leander Paes)
Double gold medallist in SAF Games in Colombo '93, Dhaka '95, and Madras '97.
Won the National hard & grasscourt titles in singles and doubles in the same year (1992)
Two National singles, seven doubles and five junior titles. Highest ATP ranking: singles 272, doubles 167.

References

External links
 
 
 

Recipients of the Arjuna Award
Living people
Asian Games gold medalists for India
Asian Games medalists in tennis
Indian male tennis players
Tennis players at the 1994 Asian Games
Medalists at the 1994 Asian Games
South Asian Games gold medalists for India
1972 births
South Asian Games medalists in tennis